El Hadi Ahmed El Sheikh FRCOphth (28 June 1933, Shendi – 23 September 2009, Khartoum) was a Sudanese Professor of Ophthalmology at the Department of Ophthalmology, University of Khartoum, and WHO's Research Fellow. El Sheikh established Abu-Hamad Town Hospital in 1962 and the Department of Ophthalmology, University of Khartoum in 1994. He was known for philanthropic work and organising eye care campaigns that offered free treatment for Sudanese and refugees.

Early life 
El Sheikh was born on 28 June 1933 in Shendi, Sudan, the youngest in a family of four sisters and brothers. His family were Tiganiya Sufi, known for their hospitality and generosity, which would later shape El Sheikh's approach to medicine and treatment accessibility.

Education and career 
El Sheikh first joined the University of Khartoum, but then left and joined Ain Shams University as his family believed that the University of Khartoum was elitist and did not align with their values. El Sheikh graduated in 1959, and started his medical training at Ain Shams University in 1960 as a house officer before leaving to join Atbara Teaching Hospital in 1961 as a medical officer until 1962.
 
In 1962, aged 29, El Sheikh established Abu-Hamad Town Hospital before moving, as registrar, to Khartoum Eye Hospital between (1962–1963), and Moorfields Eye Hospital, UK (1963–1964). He then acquired a Diploma inOphthalmology from the Royal College of Physicians of London and the Royal College of Surgeons of England in 1964.
 
El Sheikh returned to Sudan, working at Khartoum Eye Hospital as Junior Eye Specialist, and at Wad Madani Hospital as a relief ophthalmologist, between 1964 and 1965. He then moved to the Department of Surgery, University of Khartoum, as a Lecturer in Ophthalmology in 1967. He then became an associate professor in 1973.
 
Thus, after his brother's execution, El Sheikh decided to go to the UK, as he was awarded the World Health Organization (WHO) Research Fellow at the UCL Institute of Ophthalmology, and an Honorary Senior Registrar position in the Moorfields Eye Hospital between 1973–1978. During that period, he completed epidemiology and medical statistics training at the London School of Hygiene and Tropical Medicine (1975–1976). He conducted several fields and laboratory work before obtaining his Doctor of Philosophy from the University of London in 1978.
 
Upon his return to Sudan, El Sheikh joined the University of Khartoum, became a professor of Ophthalmology in 1988, established the Department of Ophthalmology in 1994, and retired in 1998.

Field work 
El Sheikh was involved in many projects to improve eye surgery with a keen interest in dacryocystorhinostomy and oculoplastic. El Sheikh worked on several projects with World Health Organization. He was the WHO expert and a member of the steering committee of Onchocerciasis. El Sheikh was the President of the Sudanese Ophthalmological Society (1979–1981), and since 1983, he was a member of the Executive Board of the International Agency for the Prevention of Blindness.
 
El Sheikh was known for philanthropic work. Since 1990, He pioneered organising eye care campaigns and creating mobile eye care units that offered free treatment for more than 23,000 Sudanese and refugees, with the assistance of HelpAge International. However, his efforts were not always welcomed, and he was taken to court several times for operating on patients outside hospitals.

Personal life and death 
El Sheikh was married and had four children. He died on 23 September 2009 in Khartoum.

Awards and honours 
El Sheikh was elected a Fellow of the Royal College of Ophthalmologists (FRCOphth) in 1990. In 1995, the National Sudanese Society for Eye Treatment named their annual prize after El Sheikh. The Sudanese government awarded him the Gold Medal for Arts and Literature and Az-Zubair Prize for Innovation and Scientific Excellence in 2003.

See also 
 Ahmed Mohamed El Hassan
 Ahmed Hassan Fahal
 Mohamed El-Amin Ahmed El-Tom

References

Further reading 
Ahmed El Safi. El Hadi Ahmed El Sheikh: Milestones in Sudanese Ophthalmology, Research in Blindness, Onchocerciasis & Trachoma. Sudan Medical Heritage Foundation Publications (2010). .
University of Khartoum alumni
Fellows of the Royal College of Ophthalmologists
Sudanese physicians
Sudanese scientists
Sudanese people
Recipients of orders, decorations, and medals of Sudan
1933 births
2009 deaths